Anupshahr Assembly constituency is  one of the 403 constituencies of the Uttar Pradesh Legislative Assembly,  India. It is a part of the Bulandshahar  district and one of the five assembly constituencies in the Bulandshahr Lok Sabha constituency. First election in this assembly constituency was held in 1952 after the "DPACO (1951)" (delimitation order) was passed in 1950. After the "Delimitation of Parliamentary and Assembly Constituencies Order" was passed in 2008, the constituency was assigned identification number 67.

Wards / Areas
Extent of Anupshahr Assembly constituency is PCs Fatehpur, Serora, Maujpur, Paharpur, Shikoi, Parli, Anupshahr Bangar, Salamatpur, Anivas, Malakpur, Birauli of Anupshahar KC, PCs Jatpura, Sankhni, Navi Nagar, Tetauta Urf Veergaun, Jahangirabad, Bamanpur, Jaser, Khadana, Khanoda, Ahamadnagar Urf Toli, Bhiroli, Ahar, Khalour, Dungra Jat, Jatvaai, Badar Khan, Moharsa of Jahangirabad KC, Anup Shahr MB & Jahangirabad MB of Anupshahr Tehsil; KC Aurangabad & Aurangabad NP of Bulandshahr Tehsil.

Members of the Legislative Assembly

Election results

2022

17th Vidhan Sabha: 2017 General Elections

16th Vidhan Sabha: 2012 General Elections

See also
Bulandshahar district
Bulandshahr Lok Sabha constituency
Sixteenth Legislative Assembly of Uttar Pradesh
Uttar Pradesh Legislative Assembly

References

External links
 

Assembly constituencies of Uttar Pradesh
Politics of Bulandshahr district
Constituencies established in 1951
1951 establishments in Uttar Pradesh